Banco is an unincorporated community located in Madison County, Virginia, United States.

References

Unincorporated communities in Virginia
Unincorporated communities in Madison County, Virginia